Big Muddy is a 2014 Canadian neo-western crime drama directed by Jefferson Moneo, set in Saskatchewan. The film follows Martha (Nadia Litz) and her son Andy (Justin Kelly), as they seek sanctuary at her childhood home on a ranch, owned by Stan (Stephen McHattie), pursued both by Andy's father—himself a fugitive—and one of Martha's criminal associates.

Big Muddy was based on a short student film that Moneo had directed at Columbia University and presented at the Cinéfondation section of the 2011 Cannes Film Festival. While the short film, which was written by classmate Brian Paccione, had been set in New York City, Moneo opted to set his feature adaptation in his home province. It was shot in 20 days in 2013, both Saskatoon in the Assiniboia region in southern Saskatchewan, and mixes elements of film noir with those of classic westerns.

Cast
 Nadia Litz as Martha Barlow
 Justin Kelly as Andy Barlow
 David La Haye as Donovan Fournier
 Stephen McHattie as Stan Barlow
 James Le Gros as Buford Carver
 Rossif Sutherland as Tommy Valente
 Holly Deveaux as June Baker
 Rob van Meenen as Bill Wilson

References

External links

2014 films
Canadian crime drama films
English-language Canadian films
Neo-Western films
Films shot in Saskatchewan
Films set in Saskatchewan
2014 crime drama films
2010s English-language films
2010s Canadian films